Lisa D. Hamlin (born Elizabeth Deann Rinna; July 11, 1963) is an American actress, television personality and model. As an actress, she is best known for her roles as Billie Reed on the NBC daytime soap opera Days of Our Lives and Taylor McBride on Fox's television drama Melrose Place. Between 2014 and 2022, Rinna starred on Bravo's hit reality television series The Real Housewives of Beverly Hills. Other television credits include being a contestant on NBC's The Celebrity Apprentice and ABC's Dancing with the Stars, as well as guest-starring roles on series such as Entourage, The Middle, Veronica Mars, Community, and 8 Simple Rules. Rinna made her Broadway debut in Chicago as Roxie Hart in June 2007.

She was the host of Soapnet's talk show Soap Talk (2002–2006), for which she earned four Emmy nominations for Outstanding Talk Show Host. She also hosted the M&M awards.  Rinna has also written three books: Starlit; The Big, Fun, Sexy Sex Book; and The New York Times best-seller Rinnavation. Her other ventures include a fashion line for QVC named The Lisa Rinna Collection, the cosmetics collection Rinna Beauty, and the beverage company Rinna Wines.

Early life
Lisa Rinna was born July 11, 1963, in Newport Beach, California to Lois Irene (née DeAndrade) and Frank Rinna. She is of Italian and Portuguese descent. When Lisa was seven, her older half sister Laurene died. During that same year, her family relocated to Medford, Oregon, when her father was transferred there for job-related reasons, and she spent the remainder of her childhood there. Rinna graduated from Medford Senior High School in 1981. After graduating, Rinna moved to San Francisco, California, to pursue a career as a model. She started her career by appearing in commercials and believed she obtained her SAG card "doing a Mervyn's commercial".

Career

Acting
At age 21, Rinna appeared in the music video for John Parr's single "Naughty Naughty," as the passenger in Parr's car. Rinna later made her television debut appearing as the girlfriend of Jason Bateman's character in several episodes of The Hogan Family in 1990. In 1992, she first received national recognition when she originated the character of Billie Reed on NBC's Days of Our Lives. Her character was an instant hit with viewers, earning Rinna two consecutive Soap Opera Digest Awards. She departed in 1995, but went on to reprise the role in 2002, 2012, and 2018. She then made the jump to primetime television, portraying Taylor McBride on Aaron Spelling's Melrose Place from 1996 to 1998. Through the late 1990s, Rinna appeared in a series of television films, including Lifetime's Sex, Lies & Obsession opposite her husband Harry Hamlin, based on Hamlin's true battles with sex addiction and alcoholism. Her previous Lifetime film, Another Woman's Husband, boasted one of the highest ratings for a movie on Lifetime since 1999. In 2001, Rinna played the role of Veronica Simpson in the comedy film Good Advice, which starred Charlie Sheen and Denise Richards. Over the summer of 2007, Rinna starred as Roxie Hart in the Broadway production of Chicago alongside her husband, who played the role of Billy Flynn. 

In 2004, Rinna guest-starred on the ABC sitcom 8 Simple Rules and the CW drama Veronica Mars, playing the recurring role of Lynn Echolls on the latter. In 2007, she portrayed Drama's ex-girlfriend Donna Devaney on HBO's Entourage, in the episode "Malibooty." In 2008, she appeared in Disney Channel's musical comedy television series Hannah Montana, in the role of Mr. Dontzig's cousin Francesca. In 2009, Rinna expressed interest in reprising her role of Taylor McBride on the CW's revival Melrose Place, if given the offer; however, the series was cancelled after only one season. In 2011, Rinna appeared on Nickelodeon's Big Time Rush as Brooke Diamond. In 2021, Rinna reprised her role of Billie Reed for a special Peacock miniseries, Days of Our Lives: Beyond Salem, alongside costars Deidre Hall, Eileen Davidson, and Jackée Harry. She has continued to appear in television roles, with guest parts on series including C.S.I., The Middle, The Guest Book, Awkward. and This Close.

Hosting and reality television

Rinna was the host of Soap Talk (2002-2006), the flagship daily lifestyle show of cable network Soapnet. She and co-host Ty Treadway received four consecutive Daytime Emmy Award nominations for their work. At the same time, Rinna hosted three seasons of Lifetime's TV home makeover program Merge. In 2007, she also hosted Oxygen's Tease, a reality competition series for hairstylists. From 2007 to 2009, she was the host of TV Guide Network's awards season red carpet coverage, replacing Joan Rivers. In 2006, Rinna competed in the second season of Dancing with the Stars with professional dancer Louis van Amstel. She was eliminated in round seven based on audience voting, despite having higher marks from the judges than fellow celebrity dancer Jerry Rice. She is a regular guest co-host on Live with Regis and Kelly.

In 2008, TV Guide reported that Rinna and Hamlin had signed a deal to create a reality television series based on their family life. The series, titled Harry Loves Lisa, premiered on TV Land on October 6, 2010, and ran for 6 episodes. In 2010, she was also featured as a guest judge on the fourth episode of the second season of RuPaul's Drag Race. In 2011, Rinna competed in season 4 of The Celebrity Apprentice. She was eliminated after being the project manager on the second task, writing and performing a children's book. Rinna returned to the show in its sixth season as one of the "All-Stars" contestants. After being eliminated from that roster, she appeared on the May 13, 2013, episode of Late Night with Jimmy Fallon with Lil Jon to discuss their time on the show. In 2014, she appeared as one of the contestants on ABC's game show Sing Your Face Off.

In 2014, Rinna joined the main cast of The Real Housewives of Beverly Hills for the show's fifth season. She acknowledged in a 2019 Los Angeles Times interview that being a Housewife brought her unprecedented attention: "I've never been more famous than I am at this point, because of the show." Rinna, along with singer-songwriter Kandi Burruss of The Real Housewives of Atlanta, was among the franchise's first celebrity hires. She is widely considered one of the best Housewives of all time. In 2020, she was nominated as Favorite Reality Star at the People's Choice Awards. On January 6, 2023, Rinna announced her departure after eight seasons.

Modeling
In 1998, Rinna, while six months pregnant with Delilah Belle Hamlin, the first of Harry Hamlin's and her two daughters, posed for a nude pictorial ("Melrose Mom," its title, paid tribute to her role in Melrose Place) and cover shoot for the September issue of Playboy magazine. She later recounted the instructions given to her by Playboy photographer Deborah Anderson: "'I do not want you long and sinewy and angular and muscular. I want you soft...' This was really hard for me because being 35 years old and posing for Playboy, you want to amp it up." In May 2009, she posed again for Playboy and, this time, was also its cover model.

She has also graced the covers of CVLUX, Living Well, Soap Opera Magazine and Soap Opera Digest. Rinna has appeared in commercials and print ads throughout her career. In 2008, she appeared in print ads for Mars Inc's M&M candies with Joey Fatone as part of the "There's an M&M in everyone" advertising campaign. In 2012, Rinna appeared in an infomercial for abdominal muscle toner "The Flex Belt" alongside Adrianne Curry, Denise Richards and Janet Evans. She has appeared in a television commercial for Taco Bell and an infomercial for Winsor Pilates. In 2012 to benefit the charity Dress for Success, she modeled an adult incontinence brief made by Depend under a tight-fitting evening gown. She appeared in print ads and commercials for Depend and, according to reports, Depend paid her $2 million to be their celebrity spokesperson. In September 2019, she walked the runway for Kyle Richards' and Shahida Clayton's new women's clothing brand at New York Fashion Week.

In 2008, she released a series of workout videos called Dance Body Beautiful.

Fashion
Rinna and her husband Harry Hamlin jointly owned the Belle Gray clothing boutique in Sherman Oaks, California in 2011. They closed the store in 2012 because, by then, both had grown too busy with their respective acting careers to manage it. In June 2019, Rinna launched an activewear collaboration with retailer Goldsheep. Proceeds from the collaboration benefited The Trevor Project, a national organization providing crisis intervention and suicide-prevention services to LGBTQ youth.

QVC 
In April 2012, Rinna brought her collection to QVC as the Lisa Rinna Collection, which has been a success.

Cosmetics
In September 2020, Rinna announced that she will be launching Rinna Beauty, with its lip kits named Birthday Suit, Legends Only, and No Apologies.

Beverages
In August 2022, Rinna announced on an episode of The Real Housewives of Beverly Hills she is in the process of entering the alcoholic beverage industry with a product called Rinna Rosé.

In popular culture
Rinna's staple bangs-and-back hairstyle and her cosmetically enhanced lips have long made her an easily recognizable figure in popular culture, and she has played parody versions of herself on series such as The Prince, The Shrink Next Door, and The Great North. A running joke in the public sphere surrounding Rinna, sometimes dubbed the "QVC queen," is her willingness to try anything and everything to put her name out there to 'secure a check', one popular one being the front-woman for adult diaper brand Depends. In 2022, a promotional image of Rinna as an M&M on the red carpet of The Academy Awards, from her TV Guide awards show hosting tenure fifteen years prior, went viral. The 'Lisa Rinna M&M' became an instant meme of Twitter and TikTok, usually accompanied by the K-Pop song "After Like." 

Her 2014 hiring on The Real Housewives of Beverly Hills is credited with 'saving' the series midway through its run, delivering a substantial boost in ratings. Her hyperbolic communication style on the series has garnered extensive attention on social media, and she is credited with delivering some of the show's most iconic scenes. Rinna's dramatic response to costar Kim Richards threatening to expose information about her husband is considered a defining moment of the entire franchise, being parodied on programs such as RuPaul's Drag Race. Other notable moments include her teary-eyed reaction to Richards' bunny gift return at the 2017 reunion and her nonchalant questioning of costar Dorit Kemsley's drug use at a dinner in Hong Kong. In 2020, a Buzzfeed profile on Rinna observed: "She’s created her own brand of iconic absurdity with her self-help catchphrases (“Own it, baby!!”), tearful controversies about stuffed rabbits, and one of the most aggressive glass-breaking scenes in Housewives history (a tall order in the franchise)."

Personal life
Rinna married actor Harry Hamlin on March 29, 1997, in Beverly Hills, California. The couple has two daughters, Delilah Belle (born June 10, 1998) and Amelia Gray (born June 13, 2001). Rinna is also stepmother to Hamlin's son Dimitri Alexander from his relationship with Ursula Andress.

She has acknowledged having plastic surgery and having silicone, Botox and Juvéderm injections. Although she remains fond of Botox, she has said that using Juvéderm was a mistake.

On November 15, 2021, Rinna announced that her mother Lois, who was featured in The Real Housewives franchise, had died after suffering a stroke.

Filmography

Theater

References

External links 

 
 
 Lisa Rinna's(collection) on QVC

Actresses from Oregon
American fashion designers
American soap opera actresses
American television actresses
American television talk show hosts
Living people
People from Medford, Oregon
North Medford High School alumni
The Real Housewives cast members
The Apprentice (franchise) contestants
American women fashion designers
21st-century American women
1963 births